Caloptilia trissochroa is a moth of the family Gracillariidae. It is known from Maharashtra, India.

The larvae feed on pepper-creeper.

References

trissochroa
Moths of Asia
Moths described in 1931